Lyromonas is a genus of Excavata unicellular organism.

It has one known species, psalteriomonas vulgaris.

References

Percolozoa